The rare O-type asteroids have spectra similar to the unusual asteroid 3628 Boznemcová, which is the best asteroid match to the spectra of L6 and LL6 ordinary chondrite meteorites. Their spectra have a deep absorption feature longward of 0.75 μm.

List 

Seven asteroids have been classified as O-type by the second Small Main-Belt Asteroid Spectroscopic Survey (SMASSII) and none by Tholen's Eight-Color Asteroid Survey. With the exception of main-belt asteroid 3628 Božněmcová, all other bodies are near-Earth asteroids from the Apollo, Aten or Amor group:

See also 
 Asteroid spectral types

References 

Asteroid spectral classes